Joe Cotton (born 12 May 1999 in Bristol, England) is a professional rugby union player, currently unattached he previously played for the NSW Waratahs in Super Rugby & Bristol Bears in Premiership Rugby. His playing position is hooker. He has signed to the Waratahs elite development squad for the 2020 season.

Reference list

External links
Rugby.com.au profile
itsrugby.co.uk profile

1999 births
Australian rugby union players
Australian expatriate sportspeople in England
Living people
Rugby union hookers
New South Wales Waratahs players
Sydney (NRC team) players
Bristol Bears players